Lung Bread for Daddy is the third studio album by English musician Beth Jeans Houghton and the second under their musical project Du Blonde. It was released on 22 February 2019 through Moshi Moshi Records.

Track listing

Charts

References

2019 albums
Moshi Moshi Records albums